Hotel Pontchartrain may refer to:

 The Crowne Plaza Detroit Downtown Convention Center, Detroit, Michigan (as its prior name)
 The Pontchartrain Hotel, New Orleans, Louisiana